Pennycook is a surname. People with this surname include:
 Alastair Pennycook (born 1957), linguist
 Chevvy Pennycook  (born 1985), English rugby union player for Bristol Rugby
 Gordon Pennycook, Canadian psychologist
 Matthew Pennycook (born 1982), British Labour Party politician, Member of Parliament (MP) for Greenwich & Woolwich since 2015
 Redford Pennycook  (born 1987), English rugby union player for Moseley in the Aviva Championship
 Richard Pennycook (born 1964), British business executive